William Oxley (1939 – February 4, 2020) was an English poet. In addition to 31 poetry publications, he was also responsible for a range of books covering literary criticism, philosophy, fiction, plays and biography.

Biography
Oxley began his career working as a messenger boy in Salford. He then became an articled clerk at Willett, Son & Garner, and qualified as a chartered accountant there. He began to write poetry after moving to London and working in the city, first for Deloitte and then Lazard.

Oxley's poems were widely published throughout the world, in magazines and journals as diverse as The New York Times,  The Formalist (USA), The Scotsman, New Statesman, The London Magazine, Stand, The Independent, The Spectator and The Observer. Following the publication of a number of his works on the Continent in the 1980s and 1990s, Oxley was dubbed one of Britain's first Europoets. He read his work on UK and European radio and was said to be the only British poet to have read in Shangri-la, Nepal. He published his first volume of poetry in 1967, and his latest volume in 2015.

He founded the magazine Littack (Literature Attack) in 1972, and also edited the poetry publications New Headland (1969–74), Laissez-Faire (1971–75), Orbis (1972–74), The Village Review (1973–74), Poetry Newsletter (1976–78), The Littack Supplement (1976-80) and Lapis Lazuli (1977–78). He also co-edited the newsletter of the Long Poem Group for several years, as its founder.

In 1976, he moved to Devon with his family, and focused on poetry. His wife Patricia founded the literary journal Acumen in 1985, with William as treasurer and interviews editor.

He became a member of the general council of the Poetry Society in 1990, and opposed its commercialisation. In 2000, William was poet laureate for Torbay, the district covering Brixham, where he had moved to. This led to him and Patricia organising the Torbay Poetry Festival from 2001 to 2019.

A limited edition print employing lines from his epic poem, A Map of Time, was chosen by the Department of Cartography at the University of Wisconsin to use, with appropriate illustration, in their Annual Broadsheet for 2002. Another of his long poems, Over the Hills of Hampstead, was awarded first prize by the online long poem magazine, Echoes of Gilgamesh. In 2008, he received the Torbay ArtsBase Award for Literature. His work is featured on various websites, including, from its beginning, Anne Stewart's prestigious www.poetrypf.co.uk and www.creativetorbay.com. His archive was acquired by the British Library in 2014.

Personal life
Oxley met Patricia Holmes through the Manchester Shakespeare Players, and they married in 1963. They had two daughters, Elizabeth Helen (b. 1966) and Katie Sarah (b. 1969). After originally settling in London, they moved to Brixham in South Devon with Patricia's mother in 1976. He died in February 2020, aged 80, survived by his wife and daughters.

Publications
The Dark Structures, London, Mitre Press, 1967. 
Mirrors of the Sea, London, Quarto Press, 1973.
The Notebook of Hephaestus and Other Poems, Kinross, Lomond Press, 1981. 
A Map of Time, Salzburg, University of Salzburg, 1984.
The Triviad and Other Satires, Salzburg, University of Salzburg, 1984. 
The Mansands Trilogy, Richmond, Surrey, Keepsake Press, 1988. 
Mad Tom on Tower Hill, Exeter, Stride, 1989.
Forest Sequence, Bath, Mammon Press, 1991.
The Patient Reconstruction of Paradise, Brixham, Devon, Acumen Publications, 1991. 
The Playboy Salzburg, University of Salzburg, 1992.
In The Drift of Words, Ware, Rockingham Press, 1992. 
Cardboard Troy, Exeter, Stride, 1993.
The Hallsands Tragedy, Plymouth, Westwords, 1993.
Collected Longer Poems, Salzburg, University of Salzburg, 1994.
The Green Crayon Man, Ware, Rockingham Press, 1997.
Reclaiming the Lyre, New and Selected Poems, Ware, Rockingham Press, 2000.
Namaste, Nepal Poems, London, Hearing Eye, 2004.
London Visions, Bristol, Bluechrome, 2005.
Poems Antibes, Ware, Rockingham Press, 2006.
Sunlight in a Champagne Glass, Ware, Rockingham Press, 2009.
ISCA ‒ Exeter Moments, Brixham, Ember Press 2013.
Collected and New Poems, Ware, Rockingham Press, 2014.
Walking Sequence and Other Poems, Beaworthy, Indigo Dreams, 2015.

Translations 

Poems of a Black Orpheus, Leopold S. Senghor, London, Menard Press, 1981.
Ndessé, Leopold S. Senghor, London, Menard Press, 1981.
She Chases Me Relentlessly, Leopold S. Senghor, London, Menard Press, 1986.
Poems from the Divan of Hafez, (with Parvin Loloi), Torbay, Acumen Publications, 2013.

Other publications 

Synopthegms of a Prophet, Brixham, Devon, Ember Press, 1981. 
The Idea and its Imminence, Salzburg, University of Salzburg, 1982. 
Of Human Consciousness, Salzburg, University of Salzburg, 1982. 
The Cauldron of Inspiration, Salzburg, University of Salzburg, 1983. 
The Inner Tapestry, Salzburg, University of Salzburg, 1985.
On Poets and Poetry: Letters Between a Father and Son, with Harry Oxley, edited by Patricia Oxley, Salzburg, University of Salzburg, 1988.
Distinguishing Poetry, edited by Glyn Pursglove, Salzburg, University of Salzburg, 1989. 
Three Plays, Salzburg, University of Salzburg, 1996.
No Accounting for Paradise : an autobiography, Ware, Rockingham Press 1999. 
Firework Planet : children's novel, Torbay, Acumen Publications, 2000.
Working Backwards: A Poet's Notebook, Acumen Publications, 2008.
Everyman His Own God, Brixham, Beugger Books, 2010.
Democratica, Brixham, Beugger Books, 2011.
The Language Game and Children, Brixham, Beugger Books, 2012.
On and Off Parnassus, Ware, Rockingham Press, 2018.

Editor

Completing the Picture – (Anthology), Exeter, Stride Publications, 1995.
Long Poem Group Newsletter – (issues 1–12) (with Sebastian Barker), Torbay, Acumen Publications, 1995 – 2002.
The Residency (Nos 1–2 only) Torbay, Acumen Publications, 2000 – 2001.
Making a Splash, prize-winners' anthology (with Penelope Shuttle), Torbay, Acumen Publications, 2001.
Modern Poets of Europe (with Patricia Oxley), Kathmandu, Nepal, Spiny Babbler, 2004.

Further reading

Bibliographies 

William Oxley: A Bibliography, James Hogg, Salzburg, University of Salzburg, 1984.
William Oxley: A Bibliography, Wolfgang Gortschacher, Salzburg, University of Salzburg, 1992.

Critical studies 

Shields, Mike: "Poet in Profile: William Oxley", Aylesbury, Buckinghamshire, The Writer, April 1975.
Stanford, Derek: "Littack: On the Attack", The Statesman, Karachi, April 1975.
Fenech, V. "Through Littack to Vitalism", Malta, Bulletin and Times of Malta, 1976.
P.H.: "William Oxley. A Survey of his Poetry and Philosophy", Salzburg, University of Salzburg, 1984.
Hogg, James: "The Vitalist Seminar" and "Vitalism and Celebration", Salzburg, University of Salzburg, 1984, 1987.
Poets Voice 3: "William Oxley: Retrospective" Bath, Poets Voice, 1987.
Mörwald, Eva: "The Role of Nature in William Oxley's Poetry", Salzburg, University of Salzburg, 1989.
Görtschacher, Wolfgang & Pursglove, Glyn (Ed): "A Glass of New Made Wine – a Festschrift for William Oxley" Salzburg, Poetry Salzburg, 1999.
Görtschacher, Wolfgang & Schachermayr, Andreas (Eds): "The Romantic Imagination: a William Oxley Casebook", Salzburg, Poetry Salzburg, 2005.
 Jeffery, Lucy: "A Study of William Oxley 1939 – ", Swansea, Swansea University, 2013.

References

Further reading
Pursglove, Glyn; ‘William Oxley: a profile’. Contemporary Poets, Detroit, St. James Press, 1996, pp. 831/2.
Greacen, Robert; 'No Accounting For Paradise (Autobiography)', review, Dublin, Irish Independent, 17 July 1999.
‘Ted Slade interviews William Oxley’; UK, August 2000, www.poetrykit.org.
Greening, John; 'Reclaiming the Lyre, Selected Poems', review, London, The London Magazine, June/July 2002, pp. 112/113.
''No Accounting For Paradise', (Autobiography); Edge City Review no 15, review, Reston, VA, USA 2004, pp. 39/40.
Steffen, Jonathan; ‘Profile of William Oxley and bibliography’, Falcon Editions website, issue 4, Windsor, October 2005.
Sharma, Yuyutsu R.D.; 'Namaste', ‘And the Leaves Fall in Silence’, review, Kathmandu, The Kathmandu Post, 13th Feb. 2005.
Myddleton-Evans, Cathryn; 'Namaste', review, Chelmsford, Seam 22, 2005, pp. 58/62.
Michaels, Mary; 'London Visions', review, London, 'Sofia', November 2006, p. 22.
Blythe, Martin; 'London Visions', review, Poole, South, 2006, p. 59.
Dordi, Barbara; 'Poems Antibes', review, Aude, France, The French Literary Review, No. 11, April 2009, p. 47.
‘William Oxley, Bibliography’, Ely, Cambridge, Dictionary of International Biography,2010, p. 810.
Harpur James; 'Sunlight in a Champagne Glass', review, London, Temenos Academy Review, review, 2010, p. 220.
Holliday, S.J.; 'Sunlight in a Champagne Glass', review, West Kirby, Orbis 151,Spring 2010, pp. 53/54.
Virvescu, Catalina Stefania; ‘Interview with William Oxley’, Bucharest, University of Bucharest, Romania, 2011. www.agonia.net.
McCaffery, Richie; 'Collected and New Poems', review, London, on-line magazine The London Grip, 2012. www.londongrip.co.uk.
Loydell, Stride; 'ISCA: Exeter Moments', review, Truro, on-line magazine, Stride, 2013. www.stridemagazine.co.uk.
Perman, David; ‘William Oxley: the Interviewer interviewed’, Devon, Acumen Literary Journal, No. 79, May 2014, pp. 14–20.
Taylor-Whiffer, Peter; ‘Poetic Licence’, profile of William Oxley, London Economia, February 2015, p. 98.
'ISCA: Exeter Moments', Plymouth, Literature Works, Book of the Month, May 2015. www.literatureworks.org.uk.
Palmer, Richard; 'Collected and New Poems', review, Maidenhead, South, May 2015, p. 56.

English male poets
2020 deaths
1939 births